Guthro is the 2001 third album from Canadian artist Bruce Guthro. The album produced the singles Disappear, Factory Line, Livin' A Lie, 4 A.M. and The Songsmith. The album is also noted for Guthro crossing over to pop from country.

Track listing
 "Hopeless" – 4:42
 "Disappear" – 2:47
 "Livin' A Lie" – 3:48
 "Hey Mister" – 3:21
 "Dig in Deep" – 3:50
 "4 A.M." – 4:52
 "Songsmith" – 4:12
 "Squeezed" – 3:25
 "Wonderful Night" – 3:11
 "Don't Go" – 4:35
 "In the Morning" – 3:19
 "Factory Line" – 4:54

2001 albums
Bruce Guthro albums
Albums produced by Malcolm Burn
EMI Records albums